Judah of Melun was a French rabbi and tosafist of the first half of the 13th century. He was the son of the tosafist David of Melun (from the area of Seine-et-Marne).

In Perez of Corbeil's tosafot to Baba Ḳamma (ed. Leghorn, p. 53a) he is quoted under the name "Judah of Melun." After 1224, he took charge of the Talmud school at Melun

He was one of the four rabbis who defended the Talmud against Nicholas Donin in the public disputation at Paris in 1240.

References
R. E. J. i. 248;
Leopold Zunz, Z. G. p. 48;
Henri Gross, Gallia Judaica, p. 354;
Heinrich Grätz, Gesch. vii. 96.
 

French Tosafists
13th-century French rabbis
Jewish apologists